The Sora (German: Zayer or Zeier) is a right affluent of the Sava River in the western part of Slovenia. The Sora gathers its waters mainly from the Škofja Loka Hills. Its source branches are the Poljane Sora (also ), named after the Poljane Valley, and the Selca Sora (also ), named after the Selca Valley. They flow together in Škofja Loka and continue the flow as the Sora for the next  until Medvode, where the Sora joins the Sava. This makes it the 15th longest river of Slovenia.

The Sora is of torrential character and often floods.

References

External links
 
 Condition of Sora at Železniki and Suha - graphs, in the following order, of water level, flow and temperature data for the past 30 days (taken in Železniki and Suha by ARSO)

Rivers of Upper Carniola